Cecil Lewis "Young Jack" Thompson (August 17, 1904 – April 11, 1946) was an African American boxer who twice held the World Welterweight Championship. He was the first African American to gain the World Welterweight Championship.  Born Cecil Lewis Thompson, his name was changed when he decided to become a professional fighter. His father, who was training him, did not think "Cecil" was a fighter's name, so he chose "Jack." To avoid confusion with another fighter named "Jack Thompson," his father decided to use the ring name Young Jack Thompson.

Boxing career
Thompson became a professional fighter in 1922. He reeled off a series of wins, but also had a draw and a loss to future welterweight champion Young Corbett III. In 1928 he fought the welterweight champion, Joe Dundee, in a bout over the welterweight limit so that Dundee's title was not at stake. He knocked Dundee out in the second round.

In 1929 he received a shot at the vacant National Boxing Association title stripped from Dundee. However, Jackie Fields beat him in a ten-round decision for the belt. In 1930 Thompson lost to Jimmy McLarnin but, in his next fight, won the welterweight title by beating his old rival Jackie Fields. After four non-title bouts (including a loss to Young Corbett III), Thompson put his title on the line against Tommy Freeman in September 1930 and lost it by a fifteen-round decision.

Freeman gave Thompson a rematch in April 1931 and Thompson regained the title by a twelfth round technical knockout. Thompson again fought a series of non-title bouts. In one of them he lost to Lou Brouillard. That loss prompted a match at the welterweight limit with Thompson's title at stake. Brouillard once again beat Thompson, ending his second reign as champion.

He continued fighting until he announced his retirement on June 2, 1932. He died on April 11, 1946, of a heart attack in Los Angeles.

Professional boxing record

See also
 List of welterweight boxing champions

References

External links
 
 Cyber Boxing Zone biography
 https://titlehistories.com/boxing/na/usa/ny/nysac-wl.html

1904 births
1946 deaths
Boxers from California
Welterweight boxers
American male boxers
World boxing champions
World welterweight boxing champions